Luis Alexander Araujo Ludueña  (born 16 January 1981) is a Peruvian footballer who plays for Deportivo Binacional, as a goalkeeper.

Club career
Araujo began his senior career with Cienciano in 2000. He stayed with the Cusco side until the end of the 2005 season.

Then had a short spell with José Gálvez FBC in 2006. Then followed two seasons in the lower division playing for Atlético Grau.

He returned to the top-flight by joining Sport Huancayo, playing there for two seasons. Then in the 2010 season he played for Inti Gas Deportes making 10 appearances and conceding 9 goals.

In December 2011 he joined Sporting Cristal replacing Manuel Heredia as the second-choice goal keeper.

References

External links

1981 births
Living people
People from Piura
Peruvian footballers
Cienciano footballers
José Gálvez FBC footballers
Sport Huancayo footballers
Ayacucho FC footballers
Sporting Cristal footballers
Peruvian Primera División players
Association football goalkeepers
Deportivo Binacional FC players